David Brazil may refer to:

Dave Brazil (American football) (1936–2017), American football coach
David Brazil (politician) (born 1963), Canadian politician
David Brazil (promoter) (born 1969), Brazilian event promoter and television personality
David Brazil (poet), American poet, translator and novelist